Shideler is an unincorporated community in Union Township, Delaware County, Indiana, in the United States.

History
Shideler had its start by the building of the railroad through that territory. It was named for Isaac Shideler, a railroad promoter who donated the land for use of the depot. A post office was established at Shideler in 1871, and remained in operation until it was discontinued in 1929. The Shideler Grain Company has grown into a major operation in Shideler, begun in 1968 by purchase of the local Farm Co-op Bureau grain elevator.

References

Unincorporated communities in Indiana
Populated places in Delaware County, Indiana